The Gables Mystery is a 1938 British crime film directed by Harry Hughes and starring Francis L. Sullivan, Antoinette Cellier and Leslie Perrins. It is an adaptation of the play The Man at Six by Jack Celestin and Jack DeLeon, previously made into a 1931 film of the same title which was also directed by Hughes. It was shot at Welwyn Studios as a quota quickie for release by Metro-Goldwyn-Mayer.

Plot
Police are called to investigate a murder at a country house named The Gables where they find a number of strange characters living.

Cast
 Francis L. Sullivan as Power 
 Antoinette Cellier as Helen Vane 
 Leslie Perrins as Inspector Lloyd 
 Derek Gorst as Frank Rider 
 Jerry Verno as Potts 
 Aubrey Mallalieu as Sir James Rider 
 Sidney King as Mortimer 
 Laura Wright as Mrs Mullins
 Ben Williams as Uncredited

References

Bibliography
 Chibnall, Steve. Quota Quickies: The Birth of the British 'B' Film. British Film Institute, 2007.

External links

1938 films
1938 crime films
Films directed by Harry Hughes
British black-and-white films
British crime films
1930s English-language films
1930s British films
British films based on plays
Remakes of British films
Quota quickies
Films shot at Welwyn Studios
Metro-Goldwyn-Mayer films